Judge Larson may refer to:

Earl R. Larson (1911–2001), judge of the United States District Court for the District of Minnesota
Joan Larsen (born 1968), judge of the United States Court of Appeals for the Sixth Circuit
Stephen G. Larson (born 1964), district judge of the United States District Court for the Central District of California

See also
Justice Larson (disambiguation)